Xisha Airport may refer to:

Yulin Xisha Airport, old airport serving Yulin
Yongxing Island Airport, serving Xisha (Paracel) Islands